John Joel Ebersole (born November 5, 1948) is a former American Football linebacker in the National Football League for the New York Jets.  He played college football at Penn State University and was selected in the fourth round of the 1970 NFL Draft.

Players of American football from Pennsylvania
Sportspeople from Altoona, Pennsylvania
New York Jets players
Penn State Nittany Lions football players
1948 births
Living people
American football linebackers